Zalesie may refer to:

Places in Poland

Greater Poland Voivodeship (west-central Poland)
Zalesie, Gmina Krzymów
Zalesie, Gmina Ostrów Wielkopolski
Zalesie, Gmina Skulsk
Zalesie, Gostyń County
Zalesie, Jarocin County
Zalesie, Koło County
Zalesie, Ostrzeszów County
Zalesie, Rawicz County
Zalesie, Słupca County
Zalesie, Szamotuły County
Zalesie, Złotów County

Kuyavian-Pomeranian Voivodeship (north-central Poland)
Zalesie, Bydgoszcz County
Zalesie, Chełmno County
Zalesie, Nakło County
Zalesie, Sępólno County
Zalesie, Toruń County
Zalesie, Tuchola County
Zalesie, Włocławek County
Zalesie, Żnin County

Lesser Poland Voivodeship (south Poland)
Zalesie, Gmina Iwanowice
Zalesie, Gmina Świątniki Górne
Zalesie, Dąbrowa County
Zalesie, Limanowa County

Łódź Voivodeship (central Poland)
Zalesie, Gmina Drużbice
Zalesie, Gmina Kodrąb
Zalesie, Gmina Wartkowice
Zalesie, Gmina Wielgomłyny
Zalesie, Gmina Zadzim
Zalesie, Gmina Zelów
Zalesie, Brzeziny County
Zalesie, Kutno County
Zalesie, Łask County
Zalesie, Łowicz County
Zalesie, Skierniewice County
Zalesie, Tomaszów Mazowiecki County

Lower Silesian Voivodeship (south-west Poland)
Zalesie, Kłodzko County 
Zalesie, Lubin County

Lublin Voivodeship (east Poland)
Zalesie, Gmina Bełżyce
Zalesie, Gmina Izbica
Zalesie, Gmina Kraśniczyn
Zalesie, Gmina Niemce
Zalesie, Biała Podlaska County
Zalesie, Kraśnik County
Zalesie, Łęczna County
Zalesie, Łuków County
Zalesie, Ryki County
Zalesie, Zamość County

Masovian Voivodeship (east-central Poland)
Zalesie, Gmina Błędów
Zalesie, Gmina Chynów
Zalesie, Gmina Grójec
Zalesie, Gmina Karniewo
Zalesie, Gmina Korytnica
Zalesie, Gmina Myszyniec
Zalesie, Gmina Nowe Miasto nad Pilicą
Zalesie, Gmina Ostrów Mazowiecka
Zalesie, Gmina Pionki
Zalesie, Gmina Sadowne
Zalesie, Gmina Siennica
Zalesie, Gmina Skaryszew
Zalesie, Gmina Stanisławów
Zalesie, Gmina Strzegowo
Zalesie, Gmina Sypniewo
Zalesie, Gmina Szydłowo
Zalesie, Ciechanów County
Zalesie, Grodzisk Mazowiecki County
Zalesie, Kozienice County
Zalesie, Łosice County
Zalesie, Przasnysz County
Zalesie, Siedlce County
Zalesie, Sierpc County
Zalesie, Sochaczew County
Zalesie, Warsaw West County
Zalesie, Wołomin County

Podlaskie Voivodeship (north-east Poland)
Zalesie, Gmina Mały Płock
Zalesie, Gmina Nurzec-Stacja
Zalesie, Gmina Siemiatycze
Zalesie, Gmina Stawiski
Zalesie, Białystok County
Zalesie, Grajewo County
Zalesie, Mońki County
Zalesie, Sokółka County

Pomeranian Voivodeship (north Poland)
Zalesie, Chojnice County
Zalesie, Człuchów County

Subcarpathian Voivodeship (south-east Poland)
Zalesie, Krosno County
Zalesie, Łańcut County
Zalesie, Nisko County
Zalesie, Przemyśl County
Zalesie, Stalowa Wola County

Świętokrzyskie Voivodeship (south-central Poland)
Zalesie, Jędrzejów County
Zalesie, Kielce County
Zalesie, Staszów County
Zalesie, Włoszczowa County

Warmian-Masurian Voivodeship (north Poland)
Zalesie, Gmina Lidzbark
Zalesie, Gmina Płośnica
Zalesie, Elbląg County
Zalesie, Nidzica County
Zalesie, Olecko County
Zalesie, Olsztyn County
Zalesie, Ostróda County
Zalesie, Pisz County
Zalesie, Szczytno County

West Pomeranian Voivodeship (north-west Poland)
Zalesie, Choszczno County
Zalesie, Kamień County
Zalesie, Police County
Zalesie, Sławno County

Other voivodeships
Zalesie, Opole Voivodeship (south-west Poland)
Zalesie, Silesian Voivodeship (south Poland)
 Zalesie Śląskie, Opole Voivodeship

See also 
 Zálesie (disambiguation), for places in Slovakia
 Zalesje (disambiguation)
 Zalesye, a historical region of Russia